The Koroit Football Netball Club, nicknamed the Saints, is an Australian rules football and netball club based in the small rural town of Koroit, Victoria. The club teams currently compete in the Hampden Football Netball League, with its football squad having played there since 1961.

Premierships
Western DFA
 1910
Warrnambool DFA
 1919, 1923
 Warrnambool Football Association
 1943, 1944
 Port Fairy Football League
 1926, 1931, 1938, 1939, 1951, 1952, 1953
 Hampden Football Netball League
 1971, 1973, 2003, 2007, 2009, 2014, 2015, 2016, 2017, 2018, 2019, 2022

Maskell Medallists
Anthony Mahony 1996 
Jason Mifsud 1997
Joe McLaren 2005
Simon O'Keefe 2007 & 2011
Ben Goodall 2013
Isaac Templeton 2014 & 2015
Brett Harrington 2018

Notable players
VFL/AFL players recruited from Koroit include -
Mark Dwyer (Fitzroy/St Kilda)
Adrian Gleeson (Carlton)
Chris Stacey (Fitzroy/Brisbane Bears)
Joe McLaren (St. Kilda/North Melbourne)
Gary Keane (Fitzroy)
Martin Gleeson (Essendon)
Roy Bence (South Melbourne/St Kilda)
Willem Drew (Port Adelaide)

References

External links
Official website

Sports clubs established in 1886
Australian rules football clubs established in 1886
1886 establishments in Australia
Hampden Football League clubs
Netball teams in Victoria (Australia)